Stefan Lemar Rodgers (born November 3, 1981) is a former American football offensive tackle. He was signed by the Tennessee Titans as an undrafted free agent in 2005. He played college football at Lambuth.

Rodgers has also been a member of the Tampa Bay Buccaneers, Philadelphia Eagles, New York Jets, Jacksonville Jaguars, Baltimore Ravens, Hamilton Tiger-Cats, and Edmonton Eskimos.

External links
Jacksonville Jaguars bio

1981 births
Living people
American football offensive guards
American football offensive tackles
American football tight ends
Baltimore Ravens players
Edmonton Elks players
Hamilton Tiger-Cats players
Jacksonville Jaguars players
Lambuth Eagles football players
New York Jets players
Sportspeople from Little Rock, Arkansas
Philadelphia Eagles players
Players of American football from Arkansas
Tampa Bay Buccaneers players
Tennessee Titans players